Erie Armory is a historic National Guard armory located at Erie, Erie County, Pennsylvania.  The original section was built in 1920, and the size doubled with an expansion in 1929.  The rectangular building consists of an administration building with attached drill hall in the Colonial Revival style. The building is constructed of brick and features a crenelated parapet.  The administration building has a flat roof and drill hall a gable roof. It was designed by noted armory architect Joseph F. Kuntz.

It was added to the National Register of Historic Places in 1989.

References

Armories on the National Register of Historic Places in Pennsylvania
Colonial Revival architecture in Pennsylvania
Government buildings completed in 1929
Buildings and structures in Erie County, Pennsylvania
National Register of Historic Places in Erie County, Pennsylvania